Atikamekw of Opitciwan (French: Atikamekw d'Opitciwan) are an Atikamekw First Nation in Quebec, Canada. In 2016, it has a registered population of 2,937 members. They live primarily on an Indian reserve, Obedjiwan 28, located in Mauricie.

References

External links
 Official website 
 First Nation Detail by Indigenous and Northern Affairs Canada

Algonquian peoples
Atikamekw
First Nations governments in Quebec